Dugald Campbell was a Scottish doctor from the Isle of Arran who went to Hawaii and set up the national health service during the 1890s. Campbell travelled extensively and in Hawaii he took up the post of government physician on the islands, where he set about raising cash for a hospital that would treat all islanders for free.  He died in 1940 in Arran.

With the success of J.K. Rowling's Harry Potter, it has been revealed that she may be his great-granddaughter.

External links
  

Year of birth missing
Year of death missing
People from the Isle of Arran
19th-century Scottish medical doctors
People from Hawaii
Health in Hawaii